The Obshcheritsa is a river in Oryol Oblast, Russia. It is a left tributary of the Nerussa.

Rivers of Oryol Oblast